The FD Mediagroep (also known as FDMG)  is a Dutch company that owns Het Financieele Dagblad and BNR Nieuwsradio. Since January 2010, HAL has owned 98.25% of the shares, after it took over the shares from Willem Sijthoff. The remaining 1.75% of the shares remained in the hands of the management of the FD Mediagroep.

The company has approximately 300 employees and had a turnover of €74.5 million in 2016.

References

External links 
  Website of FDMG

Newspaper companies of the Netherlands
Mass media in Amsterdam